Tara Sad (born October 9, 1953) is a Democratic member of the New Hampshire House of Representatives, currently representing the 1st District, and, prior to recent redistricting, representing the 2nd District since 2006.  Sad currently chairs the House Environment & Agriculture Committee, and serves on the Joint Legislative Committee on Administrative Rules (JLCAR).

External links

New Hampshire House of Representatives - Tara Sad official NH House website
Project Vote Smart - Representative Tara Sad (NH) profile
Follow the Money - Tara Sad
2006 campaign contributions

Members of the New Hampshire House of Representatives
Living people
Women state legislators in New Hampshire
1953 births
21st-century American politicians
21st-century American women politicians